The mayor of the Swiss city of Zürich (Stadtpräsident von Zürich)  presides the city council (Stadtrat). 
The office of mayor (Bürgermeister) was introduced with the guild revolution of 1336, and held by Rudolf Brun until 1360. It was abolished in the Helvetic Republic (1798–1803). In 1803, the title of Bürgermeister was given to the head of the cantonal government, and the office of the city mayor was renamed to Stadtpräsident).

Bürgermeister (1336–1798)
After its accession to the Swiss Confederacy in 1351,  Zürich was divided in its loyalties between its alliance with the Confederacy and the ties of its patriciate to the House of Habsburg. The guilds enforced a number of concessions from the pro-Habsburg patriciate in 1373, among other things the reduction of the power of the office of the mayor. 
From this time, Zürich had two elected mayors, who alternately were in office for half a year.
The same conflict erupted once again in the so-called "Schöno dispute" (Schöno-Handel) in 1393, in which the pro-Habsburg mayor Rudolf Schön (Schöno) was deposed by the pro-Confederate guilds and the constitution was changed again to reduce the mayor's influence.

From  1803–1850 the title of Bürgermeister was held by the cantonal government, while the title of the city's mayor was changed to Stadtpräsident.

Stadtpräsident (1803 to present)

Gallery

See also 
 List of people from Zürich
 Timeline of Zürich

Zurich
Zürich-related lists
Lists of mayors (complete 1900-2013)